Manchester United Women Football Club is an English association football club based in Old Trafford, Greater Manchester. The club is the women's section of Manchester United Football Club. Manchester United was formed in Newton Heath in 1878 as Newton Heath LYR F.C., and played their first competitive match in October 1886, when they entered the First Round of the 1886–87 FA Cup. The club was renamed Manchester United F.C. in 1902, and they moved to Old Trafford in 1910. The women's section was founded in 2018, playing its first competitive match in August 2018, a 1–0 win over Liverpool in the 2018–19 FA Women's League Cup.

Previously, Manchester United were associated with a semi-professional women supporter's football club. The club was dissolved in 2005, after Malcolm Glazer's takeover of Manchester United, with the club wishing to focus on its women's academy levels. A media spokesman for Manchester United also claimed the club wanted to focus on its women's academy instead of its senior team.

As of 19 March 2023, a total of 55 players have made a competitive first-team appearance for the club; of these, 31 players are currently under contract with Manchester United. The most recent player to make their debut for the club is Norwegian midfielder Lisa Naalsund who debuted on 19  March 2023 in the 2022–23 Women's FA Cup match against Lewes. The player who has made the most appearances for Manchester United is English forward Ella Toone; they have made 122 appearances. The player who has scored the most goals is English forward Ella Toone; they have scored 44 goals for Manchester United.

List of players

Appearances and goals are for first-team competitive matches only, including WSL, Championship, FA Cup, League Cup, Champions League matches.
Players are listed according to the date of their first-team debut for the club.

Statistics correct as of match played 19 March 2023

Table headers
 Nationality – If a player played international football, the country/countries they played for are shown. Otherwise, the player's nationality is given as their country of birth.
 Manchester United career – The year of the player's first appearance for Manchester United to the year of their last appearance.
 Starts – The number of matches started.
 Sub – The number of matches played as a substitute.
 Total – The total number of matches played, both as a starter and as a substitute.

Club captains

Notes

References

 
2018 establishments in England
Association football clubs established in 2018
Women's football clubs in England
Football clubs in Manchester
Manchester United F.C.-related lists